The Herbert Hoover Dike is a dike around the waters of Lake Okeechobee in Florida.

History

In the 1910s, a small earthen dike was constructed. This containment was breached by the storm surge from the Great Miami Hurricane in 1926 and the 1928 Okeechobee Hurricane, killing thousands. After these disasters the Florida State Legislature created the Okeechobee Flood Control District, which was authorized to cooperate with the U.S. Army Corps of Engineers in flood control undertakings.

After a personal inspection of the area by President Herbert Hoover, the Corps drafted a new plan which provided for the construction of floodway channels, control gates, and major levees along Lake Okeechobee's shores. A long term system was designed for the purpose of flood control, water conservation, prevention of saltwater intrusion, and preservation of fish and wildlife populations.

In the 1930s, a larger system of levees was built around the lake. Following heavy precipitation and flooding from two hurricanes in 1947, the dike was again expanded in the 1960s to create the current Herbert Hoover Dike.

The dike almost completely encloses the lake. The only gap in the dike is at Fisheating Creek, where the dike turns inland and parallels the stream on both sides for several miles, leaving Fisheating Creek as the only remaining free-flowing tributary of Lake Okeechobee. The cost of construction was about US$165 million. This should be sufficient to protect against future storm surges or flooding; however, there are some concerns that the dike is falling into disrepair.

The Lake Okeechobee Scenic Trail, a bicycle path running atop the dike, was dedicated in 1993. The trail began as the 'Okeechobee Segment of the Florida National Scenic Trail (FNST), and is part of a 1,000 mile trail between Miami and Pensacola.

Video history

A short video history of the Herbert Hoover Dike produced by the U.S. Army Corps of Engineers, titled USACE: Lake Okeechobee and the Herbert Hoover Dike.

Environment
Over the years, issues with flood control around the lake have caused damage to the environment. This has also led to the recent algae bloom (2016) by preventing the natural flow of rivers from the lake to flush the algae out to sea. Decades of runoff from agricultural and other land uses have exacerbated the water quality issues in Lake Okeechobee.

U.S. Army Corps of Engineers

Authorization
The Herbert Hoover Dike (HHD) is a component of the Central and Southern Florida (C&SF) Project for Flood Control and other Purposes. The C&SF project was authorized in the Flood Control Act of 1948, 1954, 1960, 1965, and 1968; authorization in 1970 under Section 201 of the Flood Control Act of 1965; the Water Resources Development Act(WRDA) of 1986, 1988, 1990, 1992, 1996 and 2007; and the Rivers and Harbors Act of 1930.

Background
The HHD system consists of approximately 143 miles of levee surrounding Lake Okeechobee, with 32 culverts, hurricane gates and other water control structures. The first embankments around Lake Okeechobee were constructed by local interests from sand and muck, circa 1915. Hurricane tides overtopped the original embankments in 1926 and 1928 causing over 3,000 deaths. The River and Harbor Act of 1930 authorized the construction of 67.8 miles of levee along the south shore of Lake Okeechobee and 15.7 miles of levee along the north shore. The U.S. Army Corps of Engineers constructed the levees between 1932 and 1938 with crest heights ranging from +32 to +35 feet, National Geodetic Vertical Datum (NGVD). A major hurricane in 1947 prompted the need for additional flood protection work.

As a result, the United States Congress passed the Flood Control Act of 1948 authorizing the first phase of the C&SF project, a comprehensive plan to provide flood protection and other water control benefits in central and south Florida. By the late 1960s the new dike system was completed, raising the elevation of the levees to a maximum +41 feet, NGVD. This provides protection to the Standard Project Flood (SPF) level, approximately an event occurring once in 935 years. However, investigations conducted in the 1980s and early 1990s of the dike system's potential seepage and stability problems resulted in the identification of two major areas of concern: the seepage and embankment stability at the culvert locations, and the problematic foundation conditions of the dike. During high water events piping is experienced thru the levee. In 1999, the Corps developed a plan to rehabilitate the HHD. The plan was approved in 2000 and divided the 143 mile embankment into eight reaches with the initial focus on Reach 1. This Reach by Reach rehabilitation approach has been replaced with a system wide risk reduction approach as required for safety modifications to dams.

Notes

External links

Herbert Hoover Dike coverage
Historic American Engineering Record (HAER) documentation, filed under Herbert Hoover Dike on Lake Okeechobee, Belle Glade, Palm Beach County, FL:

Dams in Florida
Dikes in the United States
Buildings and structures in Glades County, Florida
Buildings and structures in Hendry County, Florida
Buildings and structures in Martin County, Florida
Buildings and structures in Okeechobee County, Florida
Buildings and structures in Palm Beach County, Florida
Lake Okeechobee
Historic American Engineering Record in Florida
1937 establishments in Florida